Estoloides bellefontanei is a species of beetle in the family Cerambycidae. It was described by Touroult in 2012.

References

Estoloides
Beetles described in 2012